Vincenzo Meco (born 1 October 1940) is an Italian racing cyclist. He won stage 14 of the 1962 Giro d'Italia.

References

External links
 

1940 births
Living people
Italian male cyclists
Italian Giro d'Italia stage winners
Place of birth missing (living people)
Sportspeople from the Province of L'Aquila
Cyclists from Abruzzo